is one of the ten wards in Sapporo, Hokkaido, Japan. Chūō-ku means "central ward" in Japanese. City administration and entertainment facilities are centred in this ward.

History 
During Meiji Period, Sousei river, precursor of Susukino district, Sapporo Beer company and the drill hall of the former Sapporo Agricultural College were built in the area where Chūō-ku is currently located. After Sapporo was divided into wards (ku, 区), Sapporo Agricultural College, currently Hokkaido University, was moved to what would become Kita-ku, and was replaced by the Sapporo wards administration building.

In 1922, Sapporo was chartered as a city. The 1st Sapporo Snow Festival was held during the Showa period, and Sapporo City Hall was erected in 1971.

Chūō-ku was officially established in 1972, when the Sapporo Olympics was held and Sapporo was accredited as one of the city designated by government ordinance. During the Olympics, Chūō-ku hosted the normal hill ski jumping event and the ski jumping portion of the Nordic combined event. The other 6 wards (Higashi-ku, Kita-ku, Minami-ku, Nishi-ku, Shiroishi-ku and Toyohira-ku) were also established in the same year. The ski jump would be a venue when the FIS Nordic World Ski Championships would be held at Sapporo in 2007.

Overview 

The ward is located in the center of Sapporo. As a downtown district of the city, there are a lot of governmental offices and buildings of companies. The City Hall of Sapporo, the office building of the government of Hokkaido and the headquarters of Hokkaidō Police office are located.

Chūō-ku is also the centre for sightseeing, and many of historical and entertainment facilities of Sapporo are located. Odori Park lies on the centre of the ward, and Sapporo TV Tower is placed on the eastern end of the park. The Sapporo Snow Festival is also held annually in Odori Park. The largest shinto shrine in Hokkaidō prefecture, Hokkaido Shrine (Hokkaidō jingu) is located in Miyanomori area, and draws a number of people on the island during Oshougatsu (the New Year's Day). Maruyama Zoo, Mt. Okura Ski Jump Stadium, and Miyanomori middle hill jump stadium are near the shrine.

Susukino area has many bars and pubs. The street car runs from there to Odori Park going around the ward. A beautiful panorama view is enjoyable on the top of Mt. Moiwa, which has a ropeway. Memorial guest hall, Hōhei Kan, is in Nakajima Park, which houses a music hall Sapporo Concert Hall "Kitara". The Hokkaido University Botanical Gardens is also in this ward.

Economy

Hokkaido Railway Company has its headquarters in the ward. Hokkaido International Airlines (Air Do) is headquartered in Chūō-ku. Yomiuri Shimbun has a branch office in the ward.

Japan Airlines, at one time, operated a ticketing facility on the second floor of the Imon Sapporo Building in Chūō-ku. On March 31, 2009, the facility closed.

Statistics

As of April 1, 2008, statistics of Chūō-ku, Sapporo is listed below.

 Area: 46.42 square km
 Population: 211,233
 Households: 115,362
 Chūō-ku Ward Office: Minami 3 Jo Nishi 11 Chome, Chūō-ku, Sapporo-shi (city)
 Zipcode: 060-8612

Education

University

Public
 Sapporo Medical University
 Sapporo City University, Soen Campus and Satellite Campus

Private
 Hokkai Gakuen University, Yamahana Campus

High schools

Public

 Hokkaido Sapporo Nishi High School
 Hokkaido Sapporo Minami High School
 Hokkaido Sapporo Asahigaoka High School
 Sapporo Odori High School

Private
 Sapporo Seishu High School
 Sapporo Ryukoku Gakuen High School
 Sapporo Sacred Heart School High School
 Hokusei Gakuen Girls' High School

Other
The South Korean government maintains the Korea Education Institution in Chuo-ku.

Transportation

Rail
 JR Hokkaido
 Hakodate Main Line, Sasshō Line: Sōen Station, Naebo Station
 Sapporo Municipal Subway
 Namboku Line: Sapporo - Ōdōri - Susukino - Nakajima-Kōen - Horohira-Bashi
 Tōzai Line: Nishi-Nijūhatchōme - Maruyama-Kōen - Nishi-Jūhatchōme - Nishi-Jūitchōme - Ōdōri - Bus Center-Mae
 Tōhō Line: Sapporo - Ōdōri - Hōsui-Susukino
 Sapporo Streetcar
 Ichijō Line
 Yamahana Line
 Yamahana-Nishi Line

Road
 Route 5
 Route 12
 Route 36

Points of interest 

 Sapporo Clock Tower
 Former Hokkaidō government office building
 Odori Park
 Maruyama Baseball Stadium
 Okurayama Ski Jump Stadium
 Susukino
 Tanukikōji Shopping Arcade
 Hokkaido Shrine
 Hōheikan
Hongō Shin Memorial Museum of Sculpture

References

External links

 Chūō-ku ward office 

 
Wards of Sapporo